"Yo Home to Bel-Air", informally known as "The Fresh Prince of Bel-Air theme", is a song performed by DJ Jazzy Jeff & The Fresh Prince. It is the theme song to the NBC sitcom The Fresh Prince of Bel-Air.  Lyrics were composed by sitcom star Will Smith, performing under his stage name "The Fresh Prince", and the song was produced by Jeffrey Townes under his stage name "DJ Jazzy Jeff".

Townes brought up the idea of him and Smith making the theme song after learning the music for the series (composed and produced by Quincy Jones) were made and presented what would become the music for the theme song. Smith wrote the lyrics after reading up on the scripts from the pilot episode. Smith then presented the song to Jones and he immediately loved it and accepted it as the theme song.   

The song was released as a single in the Netherlands and Spain by Jive Records in 1992, with "Parents Just Don't Understand" as its B-side, and it was re-released in 2016 by the record label Enjoy the Ride. It became a hit in these countries, peaking at number three in the Netherlands and number two in Spain, and it received a Silver sales certification in the United Kingdom in February 2018. The song appeared on DJ Jazzy Jeff & The Fresh Prince's Greatest Hits album, along with a number of compilation albums.

Theme
Lyrically, the song is storytelling narrative, describing how its protagonist was "born and raised" in West Philadelphia, but after a violent encounter he was sent to live with family in Bel Air, Los Angeles. As one account maintains, the protagonist "raps about his mother sending him to live with his aunt and uncle because she was afraid that he would fall victim to [his] tough West Philadelphia neighborhood". It has thus been described as an example of the tendency of rappers to "present pathological perspectives of their own communities". The song further "explains how a boy from the ghetto would end up living in Bel-Air", and thereby "ushers in a fantasy" of an implausible scenario in which a poor person escapes to wealth.

Single track listing

7" vinyl
A-side – "Yo Home to Bel-Air" (7" Radio Mix) – 3:23
B-side – "Parents Just Don't Understand" – 5:12

12" vinyl
A-side
 "Yo Home to Bel Air" (Extended Version) – 5:18
 "Yo Home to Bel Air" (7" Radio Mix) – 3:23
B-side
 "Yo Home to Bel Air" (Summertime Mix) – 5:25
 "The Fresh Prince of Bel-Air" – 2:57

CD single
 "Yo Home to Bel Air" (7" Radio Mix) – 3:23
 "Parents Just Don't Understand" – 5:18

Reception
The single was released exclusively in the Netherlands and Spain in 1992. In the former country, it spent 10 weeks on the Dutch Top 40, peaking at number three. In Spain, it debuted at number two, its peak, and stayed in the top 20 for seven weeks. Although it was not released in the United Kingdom, the song earned a Silver sales certification from the British Phonographic Industry in February 2018 for sales and streams of over 200,000.

An article on the MTV.co.uk website stated about the song, "Say what you want, but considering the sitcom wrapped up over 20 years ago and people are still able to start spitting out those lyrics on cue, its lasting appeal is undeniably impressive." Tom Eames of Digital Spy ranked the song 3rd in a list of 25 sitcom theme songs. and Rolling Stone readers ranked the song 6th out of a list of 10 television theme songs.

Charts

Weekly charts

Year-end charts

Certifications

References

External links

The Fresh Prince of Bel-Air
Comedy television theme songs
1992 singles
Songs written by Will Smith
Songs written by Quincy Jones
1990 songs
DJ Jazzy Jeff & The Fresh Prince songs
Songs about Los Angeles
Jive Records singles
Songs written by DJ Jazzy Jeff